Édouard Alexandre de Pomiane, sometimes Édouard Pozerski (20 April 1875 in Paris – 26 January 1964 in Paris), was a French scientist, radio broadcaster and food writer.
 
His parents emigrated from Congress Poland in 1863 after the January Uprising, changed their name from Pozerski to de Pomiane, and became French citizens.

De Pomiane worked as a physician at the Institut Pasteur in Paris, where he gave Félix d'Herelle a place to work on bacteriophages.

His best known works that have been translated into English are Cooking in Ten Minutes and Cooking with Pomiane. His writing was remarkable in its time for its directness (he frequently uses a strange second-person voice, telling you—the reader—what you are seeing and smelling as you follow a recipe) and for his general disdain for upper-class elaborate French cuisine. He travelled widely and quite a few of his recipes are from abroad. His recipes often take pains to demystify cooking by explaining the chemical processes at work.

Books
La Cuisine en dix minutes, ou l'Adaptation au rythme moderne (1930) 
 Also translated as Cooking in ten minutes : The adaptation to the rhythm of our time 
Cooking with Pomiane 
"Vingt Plats Qui Donnent Goutte"IMG_7221.jpeg 1935 edition.

References

External links 

Chefs from Paris
French food writers
1875 births
1964 deaths
French male non-fiction writers
French medical writers
Physicians from Paris
Writers from Paris